George Patterson Wilson (28 May 1920 – 3 January 2014) was an Australian rules footballer who played with Collingwood and St Kilda in the Victorian Football League (VFL).

Notes

External links 

Profile from Collingwood Forever

1920 births
2014 deaths
Collingwood Football Club players
St Kilda Football Club players
Australian rules footballers from Melbourne